Castes in India: Their Mechanism, Genesis and Development was a paper read by B. R. Ambedkar at an anthropological seminar of Alexander Goldenweiser in New York on 9 May 1916. It was later published in volume XLI of Indian Antiquary in May 1917. In the same year, Ambedkar was awarded a PhD degree by Columbia University on this topic. In 1979, the Education Department of the Government of Maharashtra (Bombay) published this article in the collection of Ambedkar's writings and speeches Volume 1; later, it was translated in many languages.

In the paper, Ambedkar made a presentation a social phenomenon that emerged from the strategy of the Brahmins who adopted a strictly endogamous matrimonial regime, leading the other groups to do the same in order to emulate this self-proclaimed elite. He said that "the superposition of endogamy on exogamy means the creation of caste".

Exordium

Ambedkar presented his paper "Castes in India: Their Mechanism, Genesis and Development" at an anthropology seminar, in which he started with the following statement:

Genesis

Ambedkar believed that ethnically, all people are heterogeneous. According to him, the Indian Peninsula has not only a geographic unity, but also a deeper and a much more fundamental cultural unity. The unity of culture is the basis of homogeneity, which makes the problem of caste difficult to be explained. If the Hindu society were a mere federation of mutually exclusive units, the matter would be simple enough. But, the caste is a "parcelling" of an already homogeneous unit, and the explanation of the genesis of caste is the explanation of this process of parcelling.

Ambedkar views that definitions of castes given by Émile Senart John Nesfield, H. H. Risley and Dr Ketkar as incomplete or incorrect by itself and all have missed the central point in the mechanism of the caste system. Senart's "idea of pollution" is a characteristic of caste in so far as caste has a religious flavour. Nesfield states that 'absence of messing' with those outside the Caste is one of its characteristics, but Nesfield has mistaken the effect for the cause, as caste is a closed group that naturally limits all social intercourse outside of one's caste, including messing etc. Risley makes no new point that deserves special attention. Dr. Ambedkar elucidates that Ketkar's definition of "prohibition of intermarriage" and "membership by autogeny" as two characteristics of caste are two aspects of one and the same thing but not two different things. The prohibition of intermarriage means limiting membership to those born within the group.

Ambedkar has evaluated that the endogamy (absence of intermarriage) is the only one that can be called the essence of caste and only characteristic that is peculiar to caste. No civilized society of today presents more survivals of primitive times than does the Indian society like the custom of exogamy. The creed of exogamy, is not that sapindas (blood-kins) cannot marry, but a marriage between sagotras (gotras or clans of the same class) is regarded as a sacrilege. In spite of the endogamy of the castes within them, exogamy is strictly observed and that there are more rigorous penalties for violating exogamy than there are for violating endogamy. Thus "the Superposition of endogamy on exogamy means the creation of caste."

Mechanism

Ambedkar views that sati, enforced widowhood, and child marriage are customs that were primarily intended to solve the problem of the surplus woman and surplus man (widower) in a caste, and to maintain its endogamy. Strict endogamy could not be preserved without these customs, while caste without endogamy is fake.

According to Amebdkar, the two customs -- Sati (burning of the widow on the funeral pyre of her deceased husband) and enforced widowhood (not allowing a widow to remarry) -- intended to solve the problem of surplus women. Whereas man has had the upper hand compared to woman and is a dominant figure with greater prestige in every group. Woman, on the other hand, has been an easy prey to all kinds of iniquitous injunctions, religious, social, or economic. Such being the case, one cannot accord the same kind of treatment to a surplus man as you can to a surplus woman in a caste.  So "Girl Marriage" was the only custom intended to solve the problem of the surplus man (widower).

Origin or Development

Ambedkar believed that the "Origin of Caste" was synonymous with "the Origin of the Mechanism for Endogamy" and he treated class and caste as neighbours, saying that "a caste is an Enclosed Class".

For him, the "father" of the institution of caste could be the Brahmins who adopted a strictly endogamous matrimonial regime, leading other groups to do the same to emulate this self-proclaimed elite. The priestly class in all ancient civilizations are the originators of this "unnatural Institution" founded and maintained through unnatural means.

See also 
 B. R. Ambedkar bibliography
 Annihilation of Caste (1936)
 Who Were the Shudras? (1946)
 Dalit

Notes

References

External links
Read this book in its original form
Complete text

Books by B. R. Ambedkar
Books about the caste system in India
Dalit literature
1917 non-fiction books